Elections in North Korea are held every four-to-five years for the Supreme People's Assembly (SPA), the country's national legislature, and every four years for Local People's Assemblies.

All seats are won by the Democratic Front for the Reunification of Korea. The founding and ruling Workers' Party of Korea dominates the Front and holds 87.5% of the seats, with 7.4% for the Korean Social Democratic Party, 3.2% for the Chondoist Chongu Party, and 1.9% for independent deputies. According to official reports, turnout is near 100%, and approval of the Democratic Front's candidates is unanimous or nearly so. North Korean elections have been criticized by many as being sham elections.

Procedure
In reply to a question put forth by Michael Marshall, Li Chun Sik of North Korea stated at a meeting of the Association of Secretaries General of Parliaments (ASGP) of the Inter-Parliamentary Union:

Only one candidate appears on each ballot. Elections are ostensibly conducted by secret ballot, and a voter may cross off the candidate's name to vote against them. Voting is mandatory and turnout is habitually near 100%.

Members of the Supreme People's Assembly are elected to five-year terms, and meet for SPA sessions up to ten days per year. The Supreme People's Assembly elects a standing committee known as the Standing Committee, which exercises legislative functions when the Assembly is not in session which in practice is all but a few days of the year. It also elects the President of the State Affairs Commission, the country's head of state and highest state office, and the premier, the country's de jure head of government.

Local elections
Local elections have been held since 1999. The people elect representatives to city, county, and provincial people's assemblies in local elections every four years. The number of representatives is determined by the population of each jurisdiction.

Regarding this, scholar Andrei Lankov of Kookmin University in Seoul stated that "They have a dual system: there is a mayor/governor, technically elected (but actually appointed), and also there is a city/province party secretary. It is the latter who has real power, but mayor/governor can be important in some cases as long as he knows his proper place and does not challenge the Workers' Party of Korea secretary."

Criticism

The elections have been variously described as show elections or a political census. Seats are uncompetitive as all candidates are chosen by the Democratic Front for the Reunification of Korea. Because of the near 100% turnout, elections double as unofficial censuses. The inminban neighborhood watch-style organization reportedly watches the elections to identify and investigate no-shows.

In recent elections there have been separate boxes for "no" votes. Voting against the official candidate, or refusing to vote at all, is considered an act of treason, and those who do face the loss of their jobs and housing, along with extra surveillance.

Latest election

The latest election was held on 10 March 2019.

Past elections

Parliamentary elections

1947
1948
1957
1962
1967
1972
1977
1982
1986
1990
1998
2003
2009 
2014
2019

By-elections
 1959

Local elections

1946
1947
1949
1950
1956
1959
1963
1967
1972
1975
1977
1979
1981
1983
1985
1987
1989
1991
1993
1999
2003
2007
2011
2015
2019

See also

 Politics of North Korea
 List of political parties in North Korea

References

External links